Francisco Mago Leccia (“Mago”) was born in Tumeremo, Bolívar State, Venezuela on May 21, 1931 and died in Puerto La Cruz, Anzoátegui State, Venezuela on February 27, 2004. Mago was a distinguished Venezuelan ichthyologist who specialized in electric fish of the rivers and lagoons of South America, particularly of Venezuela. His education was Docent in Biology and Chemistry graduate from the “Instituto Pedagógico de Caracas”, (today Universidad Pedagógica Experimental El Libertador), Master of Sciences (Marine Biology) from the University of Miami, Florida, U.S.A., Doctor in Sciences from Universidad Central de Venezuela.  His Doctoral Thesis was entitled: “Los peces Gymnotiformes de Venezuela: un estudio preliminar para la revisión del grupo en la América del Sur” (The Gymnotiformes fish of Venezuela: a preliminary study for the revision of the group in South America).

Francisco Mago was a founding member of the Instituto Oceanográfico de la Universidad de Oriente in Cumaná Sucre state Venezuela and a founding member of the Instituto de Zoologia Tropical (IZT) de la Universidad Central de Venezuela situated in Caracas Venezuela.  He was a teacher of the chair of Animal Biology, Vertebrate Biology and Systematic Ichthyology at the Biology School of Sciences Faculty of the Universidad Central de Venezuela.  He was director of the Museo de Biología de la Universidad Central de Venezuela (MBUCV) and Acuario Agustín Codazzi.  He was editor of the Acta Biologica Venezuelica (ABV).  In 1968 he founded the Mago Collection of MBUCV considered the largest ichthyological collection in Latin America. It is a mandatory study resource on tropical fish for experts who wish to know more about this area. Currently the Mago Collection has a heritage of 33,000 fishes thousand preserved in alcohol and skeletons.

Publications

Books
 MAGO LECCIA, FRANCISCO. 1970: “Lista de los peces de Venezuela incluyendo un estudio preliminar de la ictiogeografía del país”. Ministerio de Agricultura y Cría. Caracas – Venezuela 285p.
 MAGO LECCIA, FRANCISCO. 1976: “Los peces Gymnotiformes de Venezuela: un estudio preliminar para la revisión del grupo en la América del Sur”. Universidad Central de Venezuela. Tesis Doctoral. Caracas – Venezuela 376p.
 MAGO LECCIA, FRANCISCO. 1978: “Los peces de agua dulce de Venezuela”. Cuadernos Lagoven. Lagoven, S. A. Caracas – Venezuela. 36p.
 MAGO LECCIA, FRANCISCO. 1978: “Los peces de la Familia Sternopygidae de Venezuela”. Acta Científica Venezolana. 29(supl.1):1–91.
 MAGO LECCIA, FRANCISCO. 1994: “Electric Fishes of the continental waters of América”. Biblioteca de la Academia de Ciencias Físicas, Matemáticas y Naturales. XXIX:1–229p.

Review, magazines and journals

 MAGO LECCIA, FRANCISCO. 1958: “The comparative osteology of the scombroid fishes of the genus Scomberomorus from Florida”. Bulletin of the Marine Sciences of the Gulf and Caribbean. 8(4):299–341.
 MAGO LECCIA, FRANCISCO. 1962: “Osteología comparada en ocho especies de Pamadassyidae (Pisces-Perciformes) del golfo de Cariaco, Venezuela y áreas adyacentes”. Boletín del Instituto Oceanográfico. Universidad de Oriente.  1(2):396–473.
 MAGO LECCIA, FRANCISCO. 1965: “Contribución a la sistemática y ecologia de los peces la laguna de Unare, Venezuela. Bulletin of the Marine Sciences. 15(2):274–330.
 MAGO LECCIA, FRANCISCO. 1965: “Nuevas adiciones a la ictiofauna de Venezuela. I”.  Acta Biologica Venezuelica. 4(13):365–420.
 MAGO LECCIA, FRANCISCO. 1966: “Los peces de los llanos de Venezuela” Universidad Central de Venezuela. Instituto de Zoología Tropical. Caracas – Venezuela. 33p.
 MAGO LECCIA, FRANCISCO. 1967: “Notas preliminares sobre los peces de los llanos de Venezuela”. Boletín de la Sociedad Venezolana de Ciencias Naturales. 27(112):237–263.
 MAGO LECCIA, FRANCISCO. 1968: “Notas sobre los peces de río Guaire”. En: Estudios de Caracas Ecologia Vegetal y Fauna. Universidad Central de Venezuela. Caracas - Venezuela. 2 volúmenes. Pp:227–256.
 MAGO LECCIA, FRANCISCO. 1970: “Estudio preliminar sobre la ecología de los peces de los llanos de Venezuela”. Acta Biologica Venezuelica. 7(1):715–102.
 MAGO LECCIA, FRANCISCO. 1971: “La ictiofauna del Río Casiquiare”. 'Revista Defensa de la Naturaleza'. 1(4):5–6; 8-11.
 MAGO LECCIA, FRANCISCO. 1972: “Consideraciones sobre la sistemática de la familia Prochilodontidae (Osteichthyes, Cypriniformes), con una sinopsis de las especies de Venezuela”. Acta Biologica Venezuelica. 8(1):35–96.
 MAGO LECCIA, FRANCISCO. 1977: “Sistemática, biogeografía y piscicultura  de los peces de agua dulce de Venezuela”. Primer Simposium Latinoamericano de Acuicultura, Maracay – Venezuela. 15p.
 MAGO LECCIA, FRANCISCO. 1983: “Entomocorus gameroi una nueva especie de bagre auqueniptérido (Teleostei, Siluriformes) de Venezuela, incluyendo la descripción de su dimorfismo sexual secundario”.  Acta Biologica Venezuelica. 11(4):215–236.
 MAGO LECCIA, FRANCISCO. 1995: “El cultivo del camarón de río Macrobrachium carcinus, un potencial desestimado en Venezuela”. FONAIAP Divulga. 50:
 MAGO LECCIA FRANCISCO., Lumdberg, John G. & Bassin, J. N. 1985: Systematic of the South American freshwater fish genus Adontostenarchus (Gymnotiformes, Apteronotidae).  Scientific Contributions of the Natural History Museum, Los Angeles County. 358:1–19.
 MAGO LECCIA FRANCISCO., Nass, Pedro. y Castillo. Otto. 1986. “Larvas, juveniles y adultos de bagres de la Familia Pimelodidae (Teleostei, Siluriformes) de Venezuela”. Proyecto S1-1500-CONICIT, Informe Final, 168 pp.
 MAGO LECCIA FRANCISCO. & Zares, T. M. 1978: “The taxonomic status of Rhabdolichops troscheli (Kaup, 1856), and speculations on gymnotiform evolution”. Env. Biol. Fish. 3(4):379–384:
 López Rojas, Hector., Machado Allison, Antonio. y MAGO LECCIA FRANCISCO. 1988: “Ecological studies in tropical fish communities”, Copeia. 2:503–505.
 Lumdberg, John G., Lewis, W. M., Saunders, J. F. y MAGO LECCIA FRANCISCO. 1987: “A major food web component in the Orinoco river channel: evidence from planktivorous electric fishes. Science. 237:81–83.
 Lumdberg, John G. & MAGO LECCIA FRANCISCO. 1986: “A review of Rhabdolichops (Gymnotiformes, Sternopygidae), a genus of South American freshwater fishes, with descriptions of four new species”. Proceedings of the Academic of Natural Sciences of Philadelphia. 138(1):53–85.
 Lundberg J. G., MAGO LECCIA FRANCISCO. y Nass, Pedro. 1991: Exallodontus aguanai, a new genus and species of pimelodidae (pisces: siluriformes) from deep river channels of South America, and delimitation of the subfamily pimelodinae. Proceedings of the Biological. Society of Washington. 104 (4): 840–869.
 Machado Allison, Antonio, Chernoff,  Barry., Royero, Ramiro., León, MAGO LECCIA, FRANCISCO., Velásquez, Justiniano.,  Lasso, Carlos., López Rojas, Héctor.,  Bonilla Rivero, Ana,  Provenzano, Francisco.,  y Silvera, Cristina. 2000: “Ictiofauna de la cuenca del Río Cuyuní en Venezuela”. Interciencia. 25(1):13–21.
 Taphorn, Donald., Royero, Ramiro., Machado Allison, Antonio. y MAGO LECCIA FRANCISCO. 1997: “Lista actualizada de los peces de agua dulce de Venezuela”. En: La Marca, E. (Editor): Vertebrados actuales y fósiles de Venezuela. Serie Catalogo Zoológico de Venezuela. Vol. 1. Museo de Ciencia y Tecnología de Mérida. Mérida – Venezuela. Pp:55–100.

Docents Manuals
 BELLO, ROSAURA, BODINI, ROBERTA.,  CHACÍN, HAYDEÉ DE., GUGIG, MIREYA DE., MAGO LECCIA FRANCISCO., RADA, DELIA. “Phylum Chordata: Subphylum Vertebrata”. En: En: Bodini, R y Rada D. “Biología Animal”. Editorial Ateneo de Caracas. Pp:87–95. Caracas – Venezuela.
 MAGO LECCIA FRANCISCO. 1980: “Phylum Porifera”. En: En: Bodini, R y Rada D. “Biología Animal”. Editorial Ateneo de Caracas. Pp:87–95. Caracas – Venezuela.
 MAGO LECCIA FRANCISCO. 1980: “Subphylum Cephalocordata”. En: En: Bodini, R y Rada D. “Biología Animal”. Editorial Ateneo de Caracas. Pp:256–261. Caracas – Venezuela.
 RACENIS, JANIS. Y  MAGO LECCIA FRANCISCO. 1980: “Taxonomía”. En: En: Bodini, R y Rada D. “Biología Animal”. Editorial Ateneo de Caracas. Pp: 35-50. Caracas – Venezuela.
 MAGO LECCIA FRANCISCO. 1983: “Ictiología sistemática laboratorio”. Universidad Central de Venezuela. Caracas – Venezuela.

Species described by Francisco Mago Leccia  

 Family Apteronotidae
 Adontosternarchus clarkae Mago-Leccia, Lundberg & Baskin, 1985
 Adontosternarchus devenanzii Mago-Leccia, Lundberg & Baskin, 1985
 Compsaraia compsus (Mago Leccia, 1994)
 Megadontognathus cuyuniense Mago-Leccia, 1994
 Porotergus compsus Mago-Leccia, 1994
 Sternarchella orinoco Mago-Leccia, 1994
 Sternarchella orthos Mago-Leccia, 1994
 Sternarchorhynchus roseni Mago-Leccia, 1994
 Family Auchenipteridae
 Entomocorus gameroi Mago-Leccia, 1983
 Family Gymnotidae
 Gymnotus cataniapo Mago-Leccia, 1994
 Gymnotus pedanopterus Mago-Leccia, 1994
 Gymnotus stenoleucus Mago-Leccia, 1994
 Family Hypopomidae
 Hypopygus neblinae Mago-Leccia, 1994.
 Racenisia fimbriipinna Mago-Leccia, 1994
 Family Pimelodidae
 Exallodontus aguanai Lundberg, Mago-Leccia & Nass, 1991
 Gladioglanis conquistador Lundberg, Bornbusch & Mago-Leccia, 1991
 Gladioglanis machadoi Ferraris & Mago-Leccia, 1989
 Family Sternopygidae
 Eigenmannia nigra Mago-Leccia, 1994
 Rhabdolichops eastwardi Lundberg & Mago-Leccia, 1986
 Rhabdolichops electrogrammus Lundberg & Mago-Leccia, 1986
 Rhabdolichops stewarti Lundberg & Mago-Leccia, 1986
 Rhabdolichops zareti Lundberg & Mago-Leccia, 1986
 Sternopygus astrabes Mago-Leccia, 1994

Honors and namesakes

Species named in honor to Francisco Mago Leccia

 Ageneiosus magoi Castillo & Brull, 1989 
 Apteronotus magoi Santana, Castillo & Taphorn, 2006
 Creagrutus magoi Vari & Harold 2001
 Brachyglanis magoi 
 Serrabrycon magoi Vari, 1986
 Stellifer magoi Aguilera, 1983
 Magosternarchus Lundberg, Coz Fernandes & Albert 1996

References 

 INSTITUTO DE ZOOLOGÍA TROPICAL. 2004. “Se nos ha ido Francisco Mago-Leccia”. IZT. Boletín Informativo. 3(2):2.
 LASSO, CARLOS., LEW, DANIEL, TAPHORN, DONALD., DONACIMIENTO, CARLOS., LASSO-ALCALÁ, OSCAR., PROVENZANO, FRANCISCO., MACHADO ALLISON. ANTONIO. 2003: “Biodiversidad ictiológica continental de Venezuela. Parte I. Lista de especies y distribución por cuencas”. Memoria de la Fundación La Salle de Ciencias Naturales. 159-160: 105–195.
 MACHADO ALLISON. ANTONIO. 1987: “Los peces de los ríos Caris y Pao estado Anzoátegui. Clave ilustrada para su identificación”. Ediciones Corpoven, S. A. Caracas – Venezuela. 68p. .
 MACHADO ALLISON. ANTONIO. 1993: “Los peces de los llanos de Venezuela. Un ensayo sobre su historia natural”. Universidad Central de Venezuela. Caracas -  Venezuela. 146p. .
 MACHADO ALLISON. ANTONIO (Editor). 2005: “Memorias Instituto de Zoología Tropical”. 40 aniversario del IZT. Instituto de Zoologia Tropical. Editorial Brima Color. Caracas - Venezuela. 156p.
 MAGO LECCIA, FRANCISCO. 1970: “Lista de los peces de Venezuela incluyendo un estudio preliminar de la ictiogeografía del país”. Ministerio de Agricultura y Cría. Caracas – Venezuela 285p.
 MAGO LECCIA, FRANCISCO. 1976: “Los peces Gymnotiformes de Venezuela: un estudio preliminar para la revisión del grupo en la América del Sur”. Universidad Central de Venezuela. Tesis Doctoral. Caracas – Venezuela 376p.
 MAGO LECCIA, FRANCISCO. 1978: “Los peces de agua dulce de Venezuela”. Cuadernos Lagoven. Lagoven, S. A. Caracas – Venezuela. 36p.
 MAGO LECCIA, FRANCISCO. 1978: “Los peces de la Familia Sternopygidae de Venezuela”. Acta Científica Venezolana. 29(supl.1):1–91.
 MAGO LECCIA, FRANCISCO. 1994: “Electric Fishes of the continental waters of América”. Biblioteca de la Academia de Ciencias Físicas, Matemáticas y Naturales. XXIX:1–229p.
 MALDONADO-OCAMPO, JAVIER ALEJANDRO. Y ALBERT, JAMES S. 2003: “Species diversity of gymnotiform fishes (Gymnotiformes: Teleostei) in Colombia”. Biota Colombiana. 4(2):147–165.
 ROYERO, RAMIRO. 1993: “Peces ornamentales de Venezuela”. Cuadernos Lagoven, Lagoven S.A. Caracas – Venezuela. 106p.

External links 

   Catálogo de ejemplares Tipos en la Colección de Peces del Museo de Biología De La Universidad Central De Venezuela (MBUCV-V)
  Colección de Peces Sección V del Museo de Biología de la Universidad Central de Venezuela
 Atlas de peces de agua dulce de Venezuela

People from Bolívar (state)
Venezuelan zoologists
1931 births
2004 deaths
Central University of Venezuela alumni
Venezuelan ichthyologists
20th-century zoologists